Greece competed at the 1964 Summer Olympics in Tokyo, Japan. 18 competitors, all men, took part in 16 events in 4 sports. Greek athletes have competed in every Summer Olympic Games.

Athletics

Sailing

Shooting

Four shooters represented Greece in 1964.

25 m pistol
 Alkiviadis Papageorgopoulos

50 m pistol
 Lambis Manthos

Trap
 Georgios Pangalos
 Fotios Isaakidis

Wrestling

References

External links
Official Olympic Reports

Nations at the 1964 Summer Olympics
1964
O